Resham Gali Ki Husnaa is a 2019 Pakistani sitcom series written by Hassan Imama, developed by Shahzad Javed, Head of Content, HUM TV, directed by Kamran Akbar Khan and produced by Momina Duraid under their production banner MD Productions. It has Komal Meer and Inayat Khan in leads while Zain Afzal, Fazila Qazi, Kashif Mehmood and Afraz Rasool in pivot roles.

Synopsis 
It is the story of Husnaa, the girl living in the street of Resham Gali, and her problem solving attitude towards other peoples resides in her neighbours.

Cast
Komal Meer as Husna
Inayat Khan as Hyder
Zain Afzal as Sharif
Natasha Ali as Shehrbano
Kashif Mehmood as Husna's father
Kanwal Khan as Fatima 
Fazila Kaiser as Safia
Saima Qureshi as Razia    
Khalid Anam as Master Sahib
Sabahat Aadil as Ghausia
Afraz Rasool as Jamil
Bilal Qureshi
Srha Asghar

References

External links 

 Official website

2019 Pakistani television series debuts
Pakistani television sitcoms